Anastasia Igorevna Moskaleva (born April 20, 1994 in Dmitrov, Moscow Oblast) is a Russian female curler.

Awards
 Master of Sports of Russia (curling, 2014).
 World Mixed Curling Championship: bronze (2018).
 Russian Mixed Curling Championship: silver (2020), bronze (2012, 2013).
 Russian Mixed Doubles Curling Championship: gold (2018, 2019, 2020).
 World Junior Curling Championships: bronze (2014).

Teams and events

Women's

Mixed

Mixed doubles

References

External links

Curling World Cup profile 

Living people
1994 births
Russian female curlers
Russian curling champions
Curlers at the 2012 Winter Youth Olympics
Sportspeople from Moscow Oblast